Grandicrepidula is a genus of sea snails, marine gastropod mollusks in the family Calyptraeidae, the slipper snails or slipper limpets, cup-and-saucer snails, and Chinese hat snails.

Species
Species within the genus Grandicrepidula include:
 Grandicrepidula collinae Marshall, 2003
 Grandicrepidula grandis (Middendorff, 1849)

References

 Marshall B.A. 2003. A review of the Recent and Late Cenozoic Calyptraeidae of New Zealand (Mollusca: Gastropoda). The Veliger 46(2): 117-144

Calyptraeidae
Monotypic gastropod genera